The Statal Institute of Higher Education Isaac Newton (Italian: Istituto Statale di Istruzione Superiore Isaac Newton) is an Italian secondary school in the city of Varese. It is a technical-professional school. It assumed the current name in 2007, with the union of the Technical Industrial School of Varese (ITIS) and the Professional Institute of State for Industry and Handicrafts of Varese (IPSIA). It is located in Casbeno, in Via Gianluigi Zucchi.

History
The IPSIA of Varese was born between 1960 and 1961 with the courses for the mechanical, electrical and ceramic in Laveno Mombello. Closed the headquarters of Laveno, the headquarters moved to the company Mazzucchelli in Castiglione Olona.
In 2007, ITIS and IPSIA become a single multi-purpose center.

Courses
Mechanical, mechatronics and energy;
Chemistry, materials and biotechnology;
Fashion System;
Electronics and Electrical Engineering;
Mechanical operator;
Industrial production and craft;
Maintenance and technical assistance;
Services for agriculture and rural development;
Evening course in Information and Communication Technology;
Evening course in Mechanics and Mechatronics;
Evening Course Maintenance and Technical Support

References 

Schools in Varese
Secondary schools in Italy